David Hillhouse Buel may refer to:

 David Hillhouse Buel (priest) (1862–1923), American Jesuit and president of Georgetown University; later an Episcopal minister
 David Hillhouse Buel (soldier) (1839–1870), Union Army officer

See also 
 Buel (disambiguation)
 Hillhouse (disambiguation)